The Jackson's fat mouse (Steatomys jacksoni) is a species of rodent in the family Nesomyidae.
It is found in Ghana, Nigeria and possibly Benin.
Its natural habitats are arable land.

References

 Schlitter, D. 2004.  Steatomys jacksoni.   2006 IUCN Red List of Threatened Species.   Downloaded on 20 July 2007.

Steatomys
Mammals described in 1936
Taxonomy articles created by Polbot